Mariano Comense is a town and comune in the province of Como, Lombardy, Italy. It has c. 23,600 inhabitants and is one of the most important cities of the Brianza. It received the honorary title of city with a presidential decree on February 29, 1996. It is served by Mariano Comense railway station.

Main sights
Church of Santo Stefano, of medieval origins but rebuilt in 1583
Baptistery of San Giovanni Battista, in Romanesque style.
Sanctuary of San Rocco

References

Cities and towns in Lombardy